Social democracy is a political ideology within socialism.

Social democracy or Social Democracy may also refer to:

Ideologies
 Democratic capitalism, a form of capitalism adopted by social democrats in the post-war period
 Democratic socialism, a form of socialism which emphasizes democracy
 Nordic model, a policy regime in Northern Europe
 Social market economy, a social welfare model in Western Europe

Political parties
 Social Democracy (Serbia) (Социјалдемократија), a social-democratic political party in Serbia
 Social Democracy (Mexico) (Democracia Social), a social-democratic political party in Mexico
 Social Democracy (Italy) (Democrazia Sociale), a centre-left political party in Italy

See also
 Social Democrats (disambiguation)
 Social Democratic Party
 List of social democratic parties